This is a list of seasons completed by the Seattle Kraken of the National Hockey League. This list documents the records and playoff results for all seasons the Kraken have completed in the NHL since their inception in 2021.

Table key

Year by year

All-time records

Notes

References

National Hockey League team seasons
Seattle Kraken
Seasons